The 1968 All-Ireland Senior Camogie Championship Final was the 37th All-Ireland Final and the deciding match of the 1968 All-Ireland Senior Camogie Championship, an inter-county camogie tournament for the top teams in Ireland.

Cork scored two early goals but Wexford let 3-1 to 2-0 at half-time. Both sides had the benefit of long puck-outs taken by their respective full-backs. Wexford won their first ever title by a three-point margin.

References

All-Ireland Senior Camogie Championship Finals
All-Ireland Senior Camogie Championship Final
All-Ireland Senior Camogie Championship Final
All-Ireland Senior Camogie Championship Final, 1968